The Type 095 (Chinese designation: 09-V) is a class of planned third generation nuclear-powered attack submarines for the People's Liberation Army Navy (PLAN) of China. It is anticipated that the Type 095 submarine will have a substantially reduced acoustic signature, within an improved hull type.

Compared to the Type 093, the Type 095 will have a more advanced nuclear reactor, VLS tubes and greater number of advanced sensors such as new active/passive flank array sonar and low and high frequency towed sonar array. Additionally, it is also speculated that Type 095 submarines may act as a potential undersea escort for any future PLAN aircraft carrier task forces.

It is reported that Bohai Shipbuilding Heavy Industrial Corporation will be building the submarines in a new plant in the Huludao prefecture, in China's Liaoning province.

See also
 People's Liberation Army Navy Submarine Force
 Cruise missile submarine
 Attack submarine

References

Further reading

External links
 "China's Quest for a Superpower Military" by John J. Tkacik, Jr. - The Heritage Foundation - May 17, 2007
 Chinese Naval Modernization: Implications for U.S. Navy Capabilities - Background and Issues for Congress by Ronald O'Rourke - February 4, 2008 (CRS Report RL33153)
 "The Implications of China’s Naval Modernization for the United States" - Testimony before the U.S. – China Economic and Security Review Commission by Richard Fisher, Jr. - June 11, 2009
 China’s Noisy Nuclear Submarines  by Hans M. Kristensen - FAS Strategy Security Blog

Proposed ships
Submarine classes
Submarines of the People's Liberation Army Navy
Attack submarines